Deon Joubert (born June 1953) is a former professional tennis player from South Africa.

Biography
Joubert represented South Africa in the 1973 Davis Cup, for a tie against Argentina which was held in Montevideo, Uruguay. He teamed up with Bernard Mitton in the doubles to beat Ricardo Cano and Guillermo Vilas in five sets. That win kept South Africa in the tie and Joubert was called up to play Vilas in the fourth rubber, but was comfortably beaten by the Argentine.

A left-handed player, Joubert competed in the 1973 Wimbledon Championships as a lucky loser and managed to make it to the third round, with wins over Colin Dowdeswell and Jaime Pinto-Bravo. In the third round he lost to Davis Cup teammate Bernard Mitton, also a lucky loser, in a five set match.

In 1978 he won two American ATP Challenger tournaments, the first in Birmingham and the other in Virginia Beach.

On the Grand Prix tennis circuit he had his best performance in 1979 when he was runner-up in a tournament in Johannesburg in 1979. He lost the final to Argentina's José Luis Clerc. The following year he made the semi-finals of the Sarasota Open in Florida.

Grand Prix career finals

Singles: 1 (0–1)

Challenger titles

Singles: (2)

See also
List of South Africa Davis Cup team representatives

Notes

References

External links
 
 
 

1953 births
Living people
South African male tennis players
Date of birth missing (living people)
White South African people